is a railway station in Kita-ku, Hamamatsu,  Shizuoka Prefecture, Japan, operated by the third sector Tenryū Hamanako Railroad.

Lines
Mikkabi Station is served by the Tenryū Hamanako Line, and is located 55.6 kilometers from the starting point of the line at Kakegawa Station.

Station layout
The station has a side platform and an island platform connected to a wooden one-story station building by a level crossing. The station is staffed. The station building is protected as Registered Tangible Cultural Properties of Japan since 2011.

Adjacent stations

|-
!colspan=5|Tenryū Hamanako Railroad

Station History
Mikkabi Station was established on May 6, 1936 as the terminal station of the Japan National Railways Futamata-nishi Line, with the other terminal at Shinjohara Station.  By April 1, 1938, the line was extended onwards to Kanasashi Station. Freight services were discontinued in 1970. After the privatization of JNR on March 15, 1987, the station came under the control of the Tenryū Hamanako Line.

Passenger statistics
In fiscal 2016, the station was used by an average of 218 passengers daily (boarding passengers only).

Surrounding area
former Mikkabi Town Hall
Japan National Route 362

See also
 List of Railway Stations in Japan

References

External links

  Tenryū Hamanako Railroad Station information 
 

Railway stations in Shizuoka Prefecture
Railway stations in Japan opened in 1936
Stations of Tenryū Hamanako Railroad
Railway stations in Hamamatsu